Graeme David Porter (born 18 March 1955) is a former Australian international cricketer.

He played in two 1979 Cricket World Cup matches in England as a medium pace bowler taking three wickets at an average of 11.00.  He also took 52 wickets in 32 first-class matches for Western Australia.

After retiring from professional cricket, he taught mathematics at Trinity College, Perth and at Kent Street Senior High School, where he also coached their cricket scholarship team. His son, Drew Porter, also played for Western Australia.

External links

Australia One Day International cricketers
Cricketers at the 1979 Cricket World Cup
Western Australia cricketers
1955 births
Living people
Australian cricketers
Cricketers from Perth, Western Australia